Fatehpuri Tappa Dahina is a village in Rewari district, Haryana, India, in Rohtak Division. Its Pin code is 123411 and postal head office is Dahina.

Demographics of 2011
As of 2011 India census, Fatehpuri Tappa Dahina, Rewari had a population of 1749 in 350 households. Males (937) constitute 53.57%  of the population and females (812) 46.42%. Fatehpuri Tappa Dahina has an average literacy (1261) rate of 72.09%, lower than the national average of 74%: male literacy (747) is 59.23%, and female literacy (514) is 42.9% of total literates (1261). In Fatehpuri Tappa Dahina, Rewari, 12.34% of the population is under 6 years of age (216).

Adjacent villages
Darauli
Tumna
Baldhan Kalan
Dakhora
Baldhan Khurd
Khushpura
Kanwali
Motla Kalan
Babroli

References 

Villages in Rewari district